This article displays the squads for the 2023 World Men's Handball Championship. Each team consisted of 18 players, of which 16 were fielded for each game.

Age, club, appearances and goals correct as of 11 January 2023.

Group A

Chile
A 20-player squad was announced on 27 December 2022.

Head coach:  Aitor Etxaburu

Iran
A 23-player squad was announced on 22 December 2022.

Head coach:  Veselin Vujović

Montenegro
The squad was announced on 31 December 2022.

Head coach: Zoran Roganović

Spain
A 22-player squad was announced on 12 December 2022. It was reduced to 19 players on 30 December 2022.

Head coach: Jordi Ribera

Group B

France
A 20-player squad was announced on 30 December 2022. The final roster was revealed on 11 January 2023.

Head coach: Guillaume Gille

Poland
A 22-player squad was announced on 22 December 2022. The final squad was revealed on 7 January 2023.

Head coach: Patryk Rombel

Saudi Arabia
A 21-player squad was announced on 27 December 2022.

Head coach:  Jan Pytlick

Slovenia
The squad was announced on 10 January 2023.

Head coach: Uroš Zorman

Group C

Brazil
The squad was announced on 21 December 2022.

Head coach: Marcus Oliveira

Cape Verde
A 19-player squad was announced on 15 December 2022.

Head coach:  Ljubomir Obradović

Sweden
The squad was announced on 13 December 2022. On 30 December it was announced Karl Wallinius would miss the championship due to a knee injury, and he was replaced by Olle Forsell Schefvert.

Head coach:  Glenn Solberg

Uruguay
The squad was announced on 31 December 2022.

Head coach: Nicolás Guerra

Group D

Hungary
A 19-player squad was announced on 5 January 2023.

Head coach:  Chema Rodríguez

Iceland
A 19-player squad was announced on 23 December 2022.

Head coach: Guðmundur Guðmundsson

Portugal
The squad was announced on 2 January 2023.

Head coach: Paulo Pereira

South Korea
A 20-player squad was announced on 25 December 2022.

Head coach:  Rolando Freitas

Group E

Algeria
A 19-player squad was announced on 2 January 2023.

Head coach: Rabah Gherbi

Germany
The squad was announced on 23 December 2022.

Head coach:  Alfreð Gíslason

Qatar
A 23-player squad was announced on 1 August 2022.

Head coach:  Valero Rivera López

Serbia
A 19-player squad was announced on 30 December 2022.

Head coach:  Toni Gerona

Group F

Argentina
A 19-player squad was announced on 1 January 2023.

Head coach: Guillermo Milano

Netherlands
The squad was announced on 12 December 2022.

Head coach:  Staffan Olsson

North Macedonia
A 23-player squad was announced on 14 December 2022.

Head coach: Kiril Lazarov

Norway
A 20-player squad was announced on 12 December 2022. The final squad was revealed on 13 January 2023. 

Head coach: Jonas Wille

Group G

Croatia
A 21-player squad was announced on 30 December 2022.

Head coach: Hrvoje Horvat

Egypt
Head coach:  Roberto García Parrondo

Morocco
The squad was announced on 28 December 2022.

Head coach: Noureddine Bouhaddioui

United States
A 24–player squad was announced on 5 January 2023.

Head coach:  Robert Hedin

Group H

Bahrain
A 24–player squad was announced on 31 December 2022.

Head coach:  Aron Kristjánsson

Belgium
The squad was announced on 15 December 2022.

Head coach:  Yérime Sylla

Denmark
The squad was announced on 19 December 2022. On 16 January Michael Damgaard joined the squad. On 23 January Niclas Kirkeløkke joined the squad.

Head coach: Nikolaj Jacobsen

Tunisia
The squad was announced on 9 January 2023.

Head coach:  Patrick Cazal

References

World Men's Handball Championship squads
2023 squads